Satan are an English heavy metal band originating from Newcastle upon Tyne in 1979, known as part of the new wave of British heavy metal movement. The band is considered influential for playing a form of proto-thrash/speed metal that was fairly advanced by the standards of the early 1980s.

Their line-up has undergone a number of personnel changes and even name changes; for a time the band was called Blind Fury, putting out one album, 1985's Out of Reach, under that moniker before reverting to Satan. In 1988, the group changed its name to Pariah, releasing two albums under that name before folding in the early 1990s. In 1998, Pariah released another album. The band's shifting line-up has included members of many other heavy metal bands such as Blitzkrieg, Atomkraft, Avenger, Persian Risk, Cronos and Battleaxe. In 1990, Steve Ramsey (guitar) and Graeme English (bass) together with singer Martin Walkyier of UK thrash metal band Sabbat founded folk metal band Skyclad.

Satan performed a one-off gig at Germany's Wacken Open Air in 2004 and finally reunited in 2011. Since their reunion, the band has performed at several European festivals and released a new album, Life Sentence, in April 2013 via Listenable Records. In 2014 the band increased their global reach by touring in North and South America.

On 2 October 2015, the band released their fourth studio album, Atom by Atom, while two days earlier the entire album was made available for streaming via Invisible Oranges.

In 2018, the band signed a new multi-album recording contract with Metal Blade Records. Their fifth studio album and first under Metal Blade Records, Cruel Magic was released on 7 September 2018. The first single from Cruel Magic, "The Doomsday Clock", was released on 6 July. Satan released their next studio album, Earth Infernal, on 1 April 2022.'

Members

Current
 Steve Ramsey – guitars (1979-Present)
 Russ Tippins – guitars (1979-Present)
 Graeme English – bass (1980-Present)
 Sean Taylor – drums (1983-Present)
 Brian Ross – vocals (1983,2011-Present)

Former
 Andy Reed – drums (1979-1981)
 Ian McCormack – drums (1981-1983)
 Trevor Robinson – vocals (1979-1982)
 Ian Swift – vocals (1982-1983)
 Lou Taylor – vocals (1984-1985)
 Michael Jackson – vocals (1985-1988)

Timeline

Discography

Studio albums

As Satan
 Court in the Act (1983)
 Suspended Sentence (1987)
 Life Sentence (2013)
 Atom by Atom (2015)
 Cruel Magic (2018)
 Earth Infernal (2022)

As Pariah
 The Kindred (1988)
 Blaze of Obscurity (1989)
 Unity (1998)

As Blind Fury
 Out of Reach (1985)

Singles and EPs
 Kiss of Death (1982)
 Into the Future (1986)
 The Doomsday Clock (2018)
 Twelve Infernal Lords (2020)

Demos
The First Demo (1981)
Into the Fire (1982)
Dirt Demo '86 (1986)

Compilations and live albums
Blitzkrieg in Holland (2000)
Live in the Act (2004)
Into the Fire / Kiss of Death (2011)
The Early Demos (2011)
 Trail of Fire-Live in North America (2014)
Early Rituals (2020)

See also
List of new wave of British heavy metal bands

References

External links
Official website

English heavy metal musical groups
Musical groups established in 1979
Musical groups disestablished in 1989
Musical groups reestablished in 1998
Musical groups from Newcastle upon Tyne
New Wave of British Heavy Metal musical groups